The Brookings micropolitan area may refer to:

The Brookings, Oregon micropolitan area, United States
The Brookings, South Dakota micropolitan area, United States

See also
Brookings (disambiguation)